S. Manikumar (born 24 April 1961) is an Indian judge who is presently serving as the Chief Justice of the High Court of Kerala ( headquartered at Ernakulam, Kochi). The High Court of Kerala is the highest court in the Indian state of Kerala and in the Union Territory of Lakshadweep.

References

External links
 High Court of Kerala

Indian judges
Living people
1961 births